A law enforcement warning (SAME code: LEW) is a warning issued through the Emergency Alert System (EAS) in the United States to warn the public of criminal events that pose a threat to public safety. These include jailbreaks, riots, and bomb explosions. An authorized law enforcement agency may blockade roads, waterways, or facilities, evacuate or deny access to affected areas, and arrest violators or suspicious persons. The warning is usually issued by a law enforcement agency and is relayed by the National Weather Service.

Examples
BULLETIN – EAS ACTIVATION REQUESTED
LAW ENFORCEMENT WARNING
RELAYED BY NATIONAL WEATHER SERVICE TULSA OK
627 AM CDT THU JUL 19 2012

THE FOLLOWING MESSAGE IS TRANSMITTED AT THE REQUEST OF...

TULSA POLICE DEPARTMENT

RESIDENTS IN AN AREA BETWEEN 16TH AND 17TH STREETS...FROM 108TH EAST
AVENUE TO 109TH EAST AVENUE NEED TO STAY IN THEIR HOMES...LOCK ALL
DOORS...AND ARE NOT TO COME OUTSIDE AS POLICE ARE PURSUING AN ARMED
SUSPECT.

$$
BULLETIN - EAS ACTIVATION REQUESTED
LAW ENFORCEMENT WARNING
EMERGENCY MANAGEMENT
RELAYED BY NATIONAL WEATHER SERVICE GRAND RAPIDS MI
1030 PM EDT SAT SEP 29 2012

THE FOLLOWING MESSAGE IS TRANSMITTED AT THE REQUEST OF THE
EMERGENCY MANAGEMENT.

CITY OF WHITE CLOUD RESIDENTS...PLEASE LOCK ALL YOUR DOORS
IMMEDIATELY. POLICE ARE SEARCHING FOR TWO ESCAPED INMATES FROM THE
LAKE COUNTY JAIL WHO HAVE BEEN SIGHTED IN WHITE CLOUD. BOTH
SUSPECTS ARE WHITE MALES WEARING WHITE T-SHIRTS AND BLUE JEANS.
ONE IS 5 FOOT 10 INCHES TALL AND 155 POUNDS WITH RED HAIR AND BLUE
EYES. THE OTHER IS 5 FOOT 11 INCHES TALL AND 185 POUNDS WITH BROWN
HAIR AND BLUE EYES. IF YOU HAVE ANY INFORMATION PLEASE CONTACT
NEWAYGO COUNTY CENTRAL DISPATCH AT 2 3 1 8 6 9 5 2 8 8.

$$

References

National Weather Service
Warning systems